Joe McNally may refer to:

Joe McNally (Gaelic footballer) (born c. 1964), played for Dublin
Joe McNally (photographer) (born 1952), American photographer